Jan Brumovský (born 26 June 1937 in Levice) is a Czech former football forward who competed in the 1964 Summer Olympics. He played in the Czechoslovak First League at club level for Dukla Prague, taking part in 242 matches and scoring 42 goals.

References

1937 births
Living people
Czechoslovak footballers
Czech footballers
Olympic footballers of Czechoslovakia
Olympic silver medalists for Czechoslovakia
Olympic medalists in football
Footballers at the 1964 Summer Olympics
Medalists at the 1964 Summer Olympics
Dukla Prague footballers
People from Levice
Sportspeople from the Nitra Region
Association football forwards
Czechoslovakia international footballers